The Bardic Rail Signalling Lamp was the original name of a particular type of electric railway signalling handlamp made from 1962 by Bardic, Ltd. for use by rail and trackside workers. The lamp provided the colours red, green, yellow and white. Today, it refers to any lamp used for signalling that gives red, green, yellow and white colours that is in use by British railways to provide signalling.

Bardic lamps are still in use today, although lighter than the originals, and may be used to hold trains and at night to signal the last train. It is usually considered standard for railway staff to have one. Network Rail have now approved a smaller, more convenient lamp that uses super bright LEDs.  The trade name Bardic has been owned by Honeywell since 2004, when they took over Novar plc.

They were also used by the British Army and other military groups.

References

Types of lamp
British Rail
Railway signalling
British Army equipment